Jeff Lawrence may refer to:
 Jeff Lawrence (unionist) (born 1952), Australian trade unionist
 Jeff Lawrence (entrepreneur) (born 1957), entrepreneur, technologist and philanthropist

See also
Geoffrey Lawrence (disambiguation)